Bhutan is home to numerous museums that showcase the rich traditions, history, culture and art and folks forms of the Bhutanese people. The museums also showcase the ancient history from over a 1500 years and also the recent history of the Wangchuck dynasty. Bhutan also has rich traditions of  herbal and traditional forms of medicine that the museums highlight. 

The Museums of Bhutan are mostly state run and funded. Most of the museums are spread between 3 locations: Thimphu, Paro and Trongsa.

Museums

See also
 Tourism in Bhutan
 Culture of Bhutan
 National Library of Bhutan
 List of museums

References

External links

 
Museums
Bhutan
Museums
Museums
Bhutan